Thomas Boynton may refer to:

 Thomas Jefferson Boynton (1838–1871), American lawyer, journalist, and judge
 Thomas J. Boynton (politician) (1856–1945), U.S. political figure in Vermont and Massachusetts
 Thomas Boynton (MP) (1523–1582), Member of Parliament (MP) for Boroughbridge
 Thomas Boynton (antiquarian) (died 1919), Antiquarian from East Yorkshire